14 Nam Cheong Street is a 6-story building in Hong Kong completed in 1964. The building is a fourth-gen tong lau. It is a corner house.

The building is located in Sham Shui Po District in West Kowloon, at the junction of Nam Cheong Street and Boundary Street. It is busy with people and the units inside are very small.

History 
The land was surveyed by the Lands Department.

There are two theories:
A theory claimed that it belonged to a wealthy man. According to the Land Registry, the first and second floors of this building were sold to a company for 6 million yuan back in 1991.
Another theory states that a person surnamed Cai claimed that this is his ancestral land. The building before is a two-story tenement. Four stories were built and added in its later years. 

In 2015, Mascotte Holdings Limited acquired a number of flats for HKD 34.6 million.

In 2019, the building was renovated as of today. Its exterior is now colored bronze and its terraces are sealed. The red handwriting sign vanished.

Other buildings 
Sham Shui Po Ferry Pier
Kwan Tai Temple
Sham Shui Po Public Dispensary
Wo Cheong Watches, Jewelry, and Clothing
34 Pei Ho Street
Nam Cheong Station

References

External links 

Flickr：為群公寓
YouTube：今非昔比 - 南昌街14號為群公寓

Buildings and structures in Hong Kong
Sham Shui Po